Unieqav is the ninth solo studio album by German electronic artist Alva Noto. The record was released on 16 March 2018 via Noton label.

Background
The album Unieqav is the third and final installment in his Uni trilogy after 2008’s Unitxt and 2011’s Univrs. This is also seen in the coverart for each, which, when combined, form a triptych spelling Uni. The music is more rhythmic and dancefloor-oriented. Noto explains that the compositions sonically represent an underwater dive.

Reception
Ludovic Hunter-Tilney of Financial Times wrote "Nicolai’s music is inspired by science and data, a sound world of patterns and randomness, such as Unitxt’s conversion of Word and Excel files into sonic form. Patterns win out over randomness on Unieqav. Its 12 tracks are locked into intense geometric patterns, embroidered by the wonderfully detailed digital tones and textures that Nicolai conjures from his software. Sparse techno beats are imprinted in grid-like repetitions. The effect is austere but the degree of action taking place alongside ensures it does not become too severe. Track names advertise the play of difference and similarity".

Andrew Ryce of Resident Advisor stated "Nicolai does a lot with very little. He can reduce his sound down to bundles of frequencies and pulses of noise in ways that can encompass techno, ambient and drone. He can endow the barest sounds with personality, turning them into music that sounds like little else. That's why Unieqav's simple formula is so thrilling: this is dance music with masterful sound design, like techno with an operating system upgrade. The album channels Alva Noto's trademark sounds into jittery, funky music that loses none of the complexity of his more challenging work. That must have been some night in Tokyo—we're still reaping the rewards over a decade later".

Track listing

Personnel
Alva Noto – primary artist
Bo Kondren – mastering

References

External links

2018 albums
Alva Noto albums
Raster-Noton albums